Robert Young, LL.D. (10 September 1822 – 14 October 1888) was a Scottish publisher who was self-taught and proficient in various Oriental languages. He published several works, the best known being a Bible translation, commonly referred to as Young's Literal Translation, and his Bible concordance, The Analytical Concordance to the Bible.

Life
Robert Young was born in Edinburgh, Scotland, the son of John Young a book-binder on Parliament Square on the Royal Mile.  He served an apprenticeship in printing and simultaneously taught himself various oriental languages. He eventually joined the Free Church, and in 1847 he started his own business of printing and selling books, particularly of works related to Old Testament studies, with a shop at 5 North Bank Street off the Royal Mile.

For three years he was connected with Thomas Chalmers's Territorial church sabbath school in the West Port, Edinburgh. From 1856 to 1861 he was literary missionary and superintendent of the mission press at Surat; and during this time he added Gujarati to his acquirements. From 1864 to 1874 he conducted the ‘Missionary Institute;’ in 1867 he visited cities in the United States. In 1871 he was an unsuccessful candidate for the Hebrew chair at the University of St Andrews. Most of his life was passed in Edinburgh, where he died at home, 14 Grange Terrace, on 14 October 1888.

He is buried in the north-east section of the Grange Cemetery.

Family

He was married to Margaret Turnbull (1823-1887). They had three sons and four daughters.

Works
On starting business as a printer he published works intended to facilitate the study of the Old Testament and its versions, of which the first was an edition with translation of Maimonides's 613 precepts.

His major works include:

The Analytical Concordance to the Bible for the King James Version
A Literal Translation of the Bible, 1862, with a revision in 1887, and a posthumous revision in 1898
Concise Critical Comments on the Holy Bible, a companion to A Literal Translation of the Bible
Dictionary of Bible Words & Synonyms, or a Key to the Hidden Meanings of the Sacred Scripture
Grammatical analysis of the Hebrew, Chaldee, and Greek Scriptures. The Book of Psalms in Hebrew

References

Notes

Attribution

External links

 
 

1822 births
1888 deaths
Publishers (people) from Edinburgh
Scottish book publishers (people)
19th-century Scottish businesspeople
Scottish biblical scholars
Scottish orientalists
Scottish translators